The UK Rock & Metal Albums Chart is a record chart which ranks the best-selling rock and heavy metal albums in the United Kingdom. Compiled and published by the Official Charts Company, the data is based on each album's weekly physical sales, digital downloads and streams. In 1999, there were 19 albums that topped the 52 published charts. The first number-one album of the year was Metallica's covers album Garage Inc., which remained at number one for the opening week of the year at the end of a five-week run which began in the week ending 5 December 1998. The final number-one album of the year was Live Era '87–'93, the first live album by American hard rock band Guns N' Roses, which spent the last three weeks of the year (and the first one of 2000) at number one.

The most successful album on the UK Rock & Metal Albums Chart in 1999 was The Offspring's fourth studio album Americana, which spent a total of 17 weeks at number one over six spells, including a run of ten consecutive weeks between January and March. Americana was the best-selling rock and metal album of the year, ranking 50th in the UK End of Year Albums Chart. The Matrix: Music from the Motion Picture spent six weeks at number one, Blood Sugar Sex Magik by Red Hot Chili Peppers was number one for four weeks in 1999, the self-titled debut album by Garbage topped the chart for three weeks, and five albums – Rides, Nevermind, The Burning Red, Experience Hendrix: The Best of Jimi Hendrix and The Battle of Los Angeles – each spent two weeks at number one on the chart in 1999.

Chart history

See also
1999 in British music
List of UK Rock & Metal Singles Chart number ones of 1999

References

External links
Official UK Rock & Metal Albums Chart Top 40 at the Official Charts Company
The Official UK Top 40 Rock Albums at BBC Radio 1

1999 in British music
UK Rock and Metal Albums
1999